Michael Wilhoite (born December 7, 1986) is an American football coach and former linebacker who is currently the outside linebackers coach for the Denver Broncos of the National Football League (NFL). He played college football at Washburn University where he played six different positions, including linebacker and safety. He was originally signed as an undrafted free agent by the Omaha Nighthawks of the United Football League (UFL) in 2011.

Early years
Prior to playing in the NFL, Wilhoite's coaches would use him at other positions due to his athleticism, which also included quarterback in high school.  He had played six different positions in total during his college career.

Professional career

Omaha Nighthawks
After going unselected in the 2011 NFL Draft, Wilhoite signed with the Omaha Nighthawks and spent the entire 2011 UFL season with them.

San Francisco 49ers

On December 14, 2011, Wilhoite was signed to the practice squad of the San Francisco 49ers.

He was waived for final roster cuts before the start of the 2012 season, but was signed back to the practice squad on September 1, 2012. After being on the practice squad for twelve weeks in 2012, he was promoted to the active roster.  He finished with 11 tackles and made several key plays on special teams during the 49ers run to Super Bowl XLVII, where they fell 34–31 to the Baltimore Ravens.

After the Super Bowl, he remained part of the 49ers active roster the next season.

Set to be a restricted free agent, Wilhoite was offered a tender by the 49ers on March 12, 2014. He signed his tender on April 21.

On November 16, 2014, against the New York Giants, Wilhoite recorded his first career interception, which came off of Eli Manning.

On March 8, 2016, Wilhoite signed a one-year contract extension with the 49ers.

Seattle Seahawks
On March 24, 2017, Wilhoite signed with the Seattle Seahawks.

Coaching career

New Orleans Saints 
Wilhoite was hired by the Saints as a special teams assistant in 2019.

References

External links 

San Francisco 49ers bio
Washburn Ichabods bio

1986 births
Living people
People from Manhattan, Kansas
Players of American football from Kansas
American football linebackers
Washburn Ichabods football players
Omaha Nighthawks players
San Francisco 49ers players
Seattle Seahawks players
New Orleans Saints coaches
Los Angeles Chargers coaches